Johann Wilhelm Dilich (1600 – 1657) worked between 1628 and 1657 as an engineer and master builder in Frankfurt am Main.

Born in Kassel, we was the son of master builder .
He used instruments made by the imperial instrument maker Erasmus Habermehl (died in 1606 in Prague). Dilich had uniform leather cases produced for these devices:
 Octagonal vertical sundial signed "Erasmus Habermehl fecit 89"
 Conversion plate with slide signed "Erasmus habermehl"
 Octagonal vertical sundial signed "E.H.fecit"
 Theodolite signed "Erasmus Habermehl"
 Round vertical sundial

Works 
 Peribologia oder Bericht Wilhelmi Dilichij Hist: Von Vestungsgebewen Vieler orter, as well as with native reasons and published by Johannem Wilhelmum Dilichium, Frankfurt 1640
 Peribologia Seu Muniendorum Locor[um] Ratio Wilhelmi Dilichii, Edita Sumptus Et Typos Suppedi Tante Joanne Wilhelmo Dilichio F: Architecto, Frankfurt 1641
 Kurtzer Unterricht Wie auff Unterschiedene Arten mann einen fürgegebenen Platz Fortificiren kan, Frankfurt 1642
 His drawings of the Frankfurt fortress were kept in the city archive and were lost during the Second World War.

Bibliography 
 Tobias Büchi: Das Festungsbuch Wilhelm & Johann Wilhelm Dilichs, in Scholion 3, 2004, .

Weblinks

References 

17th-century German architects
Businesspeople from Frankfurt
Engineers from Kassel
1600 births
1657 deaths
17th-century German writers
17th-century German male writers